Przęsocin  is a small village south of the town of Police, Poland

History 
Przęsocin, until 1945 known as Neuendorf (as part of Germany), became part of Poland after the end of World War II and changed its name to the Polish Przęsocin.

Notable residents
 Artur Bahr (1920-1944), officer

Tourism
Church from 15th century built with granite
PTTK path (red footpath "Ścieżkami Dzików") in an area of Przęsocin in Wkrzanska Forest

Communication

bus lines to Police, Poland:
101 to Police, Poland: Mścięcino, the Old Town and Jasienica
107 to Police, Poland: Mścięcino, the Old Town and the New Town
bus lines to Szczecin: 
101 to Szczecin: Szczecin-Bukowo, Szczecin-Żelechowa, Centrum
107 to Szczecin: Szczecin-Bukowo, Szczecin-Żelechowa, Centrum

References 

Villages in Police County